Royston is a ward in the metropolitan borough of Barnsley, South Yorkshire, England.  The ward contains four listed buildings that are recorded in the National Heritage List for England.  Of these, one is listed at Grade I, the highest of the three grades, and the others are at Grade II, the lowest grade.  The ward contains the town of Royston, the village of Carlton, and the surrounding area.  The listed buildings consist of two churches, a wayside cross, and a former farmhouse.


Key

Buildings

References

Citations

Sources

 

Lists of listed buildings in South Yorkshire
Buildings and structures in the Metropolitan Borough of Barnsley